The Fries Scheepvaart Museum is a maritime museum in the Kleinzand area of Sneek, Netherlands. Located in the province of Friesland, it contains a library, film viewing room, and focuses on local seafaring life. It is housed in canal buildings dated to 1844 and offers collections of old sailing ships models, naval paintings, and silver pieces. The museum was founded in 1938.

Collection

 The museum includes items of female speed skaters: Jikke Gaastra, Sjoukje Bouma and Geesje Woudstra.
 The museum includes work of painter and draftsman Douwe de Hoop. 
 Engraving of Wigerus Vitringa
 Painting Jacobus Deketh
 The Figurehead of Wylo

References

External links
 
Official site

Sneek
Museums in Friesland
Transport infrastructure completed in 1844
Maritime museums in the Netherlands
Museums established in 1938
1938 establishments in the Netherlands
20th-century architecture in the Netherlands